"Stoopid" (stylized in all caps) is a song by American rapper 6ix9ine featuring American rapper Bobby Shmurda. Produced by Tay Keith, it was released commercially on October 5, 2018, as a single from his debut studio album Dummy Boy. It peaked at number 25 on the US Billboard Hot 100, and was certified platinum by the RIAA.

Lyrics and composition 
"Stoopid" features a trap beat and a siren. Bobby Shmurda's verse is rapped over a phone. In the song, 6ix9ine insults radio personality Ebro Darden, saying, "That nigga Ebro, he a bitch/Just another old nigga on a young nigga dick". The lyrics were in response to a feud the two had been engaged in.

Critical reception 
The song received mixed reviews from outlets. Although praising the "evil charm" of the song, Craig Jenkins of Vulture felt that it "cannibaliz[ed] flows and jokes from older 6ix9ine songs". Writing for Consequence of Sound, Wren Graves praised Bobby Shmurda's verse. Contrary to Graves' praise, Rolling Stone'''s Mose Reeves found Shmurda's verse "Hissy" and "Literally phoned in". Reviewing Dummy Boy'' for HipHopDX, Kyle Eustice called the song a "banger that seemingly sets a rowdy tone for the rest of the 34-minute effort", but added that it set up the listener for disappointment.

Music video 
The music video was released the same day as the song's release. Directed by Trifedrew, William Asher and TheDonCanon of Figure Eight Creative Group, the video features 6ix9ine driving through a desert in a rainbow colored Ferrari and riding roller coasters at IMG Worlds of Adventure in Dubai.

Chart performance

Certifications

References

External links
  on SoundCloud

2018 singles
2018 songs
6ix9ine songs
Songs written by 6ix9ine
Songs written by Boi-1da
Song recordings produced by Tay Keith
Trap music songs
Hardcore hip hop songs
Songs written by Tay Keith